Josef Fares (born 19 September 1977) is a Swedish-Lebanese film director and video game designer of Assyrian descent. His brother is the actor Fares Fares, who has appeared in many of his films. He is the founder of Hazelight Studios.

Biography 

Josef Fares moved to Sweden when he was 10 years old, fleeing the Lebanese Civil War with his family. Variety declared him one of ten upcoming directors to watch in 2006. The same year he won the Nordic Council Film Prize for his film Zozo. In 2013, he directed his first video game, Brothers: A Tale of Two Sons. The game was well received by critics. Its focus is on the interaction between two brothers and on their journey to save their father. He then formed his development company named Hazelight Studios, and partnered with publisher Electronic Arts for his next video game, A Way Out, which was released 23 March 2018.

On December 7, 2017, Josef appeared on The Game Awards 2017 and gave a "passionate" speech while on stage with host Geoff Keighley, where he covered many topics including EA's microtransaction controversy with Star Wars Battlefront II, and his game A Way Out; he also spent time to heavily criticize the Oscars due to their dispassionate take on video games, in what became known as his "fuck the Oscars" speech. Because of his speech, he has received international praise among fans and his speech has created a new Internet meme involving mass vandalism of relevant Wikipedia pages, usually to reference the 2003 movie The Room, as many people compared him to the movie's director, Tommy Wiseau. Fares includes his "fuck the Oscars" speech as an Easter egg in his 2021 game It Takes Two and referenced the speech while accepting the game's Game of the Year Award at The Game Awards 2021

Industry perspective 
In an interview to The Washington Post following It Takes Twos win at The Game Awards 2021, Fares expressed his perspective on several topics in the game industry. He said he would "rather get shot in the knee" than include NFTs in future games, he also put forward that adjusting game design to make the player pay is wrong, and stated "For me, gaming is art". Fares has also commented on the topic of sexual harassment within the gaming industry which was brought up at The Game Awards 2021 with respect to Activision Blizzard and its CEO Bobby Kotick, saying "I think sometimes you need to go through some shit to get to the other side. That’s what’s happening", as well as that unions help "but that’s just one of the things. I don’t think it solves everything. Education and knowledge, I think that’s most important."

Filmography

Film
Jalla! Jalla! (2000)
Kopps (2003)
Zozo (2005)
Leo (2007)
Balls (2010)

Video games

References

External links
Hazelight Studios

1977 births
Crystal Simorgh recipients
Living people
Male actors from Beirut
Swedish video game designers
Video game writers
Swedish film directors
Swedish people of Assyrian/Syriac descent
Swedish male actors